Igreja de São Romão de Arões is a church in Portugal. It is classified as a National monuments of Portugal.

Churches in Braga District
National monuments in Braga District